The Wickham–De Vol House is an historic building located in Council Bluffs, Iowa, United States.  The house was occupied by two prominent families.  O.P. Wickham was a prominent contractor and brick manufacturer who built the house in 1878, and the De Vols, who altered its appearance in 1913, operated a retail hardware business.  The two-story brick house was constructed using the Italianate style with Eastlake detailing.  After its renovation it took on more of a clean, modern, and horizontal appearance after its roof line and porches were altered.  The house was listed on the National Register of Historic Places in 1995.  In 2005 it was included as a contributing property in the Willow-Bluff-3rd Street Historic District.

References

Houses completed in 1878
Houses in Council Bluffs, Iowa
National Register of Historic Places in Pottawattamie County, Iowa
Houses on the National Register of Historic Places in Iowa
Individually listed contributing properties to historic districts on the National Register in Iowa